Pancur Batu is a sub-district in Deli Serdang Regency, North Sumatra, Indonesia.

Air disaster 
On September 26, 1997, Garuda Indonesia Flight 152 crashed in the sub-district, killing all 234 people on board. It is the deadliest aviation disaster to occur in Indonesia.

References 

Populated places in North Sumatra